Rock N' Roll is a 2007 Malayalam musical comedy film written and directed by Ranjith, starring Mohanlal, Lakshmi Rai, Mukesh, Lal, Siddique, Manoj K.Jayan, Rahman, Harisree Ashokan and Jagathy Sreekumar. The film tells the story of seven musicians in Chennai, the major centre of film production in South India. The film was released on November 9 coinciding with Deepavali. It received negative reviews and was considered a commercial disaster at the time of release. Over the years, the movie along with Mohanlal's performance has attained a cult status. Suraj Venjaramoodu's cameo role as a fraud musician was widely acclaimed and is often considered to be one of his early breakthroughs.

Plot 
The film tells the story of Chandramouli (Mohanlal), a composer and drummer, of his return to Chennai from South Africa for a brief visit, and of the incidents happening in that short span. Gunasekharan (Siddique), a leading music composer, is busy with his composition for the latest film directed by Lal Jose. He feels that it would be better if he gets the help of his old friend Chandramouli, who is now busy with his international concerts. But Mouli, a fun loving and jovial musician, makes a surprise landing in Chennai and helps Guna in his work. Mouli accidentally falls in love with Daya Sreenivasan (Lakshmi Rai), the female playback singer, who is also an ardent fan of him. But because of the compulsions from her parents and fiancé, Vivek (Anoop Menon), she moves back to Mumbai. Mouli plots a plan with his friend Thabala Balu (Harisree Ashokan) to bring her back to Chennai. He makes Daya believe that he is now composing a dozen songs for a film and wants Daya to sing it. Daya, who comes back to Chennai, is not impressed by Mouli's tunes. When she openly expresses her unhappiness over the tune, Mouli takes it as a prestige issue and composes a song entirely dedicated to her. However, Daya is unable to attend the studio on that particular date as she will marry Vivek, whom she feels is too arrogant and sophisticated for her. Mouli enters the marriage venue and takes Daya to the studio for 30 minutes despite the opposition from her family members. Daya, who within time is fully in love with Mouli, realizes his love for her and opens her mind to him. The film ends with Mouli relaxing at a beach with Daya, but his old habits of carefree nature and passion for girls still not gone.

Cast 

 Mohanlal as Chandramouli, an international drummer 
 Mukesh as Vishwanath (Vichan), a re-recordist
 Lal as Issac, a violinist
 Siddique as Gunasekhar, a music director
 Manoj K. Jayan as Gireeshan a.k.a. Saidapet Giri, an aspiring singer-turned don
 Rahman as Henry, a keyboardist
 Harisree Ashokan as Balachandran a.k.a. Balu, a tablist
 Jagathy Sreekumar as Khader Khan
 Lakshmi Rai as Daya Sreenivas, a singer
 Anoop Menon as Vivek
 Suraj Venjaramoodu as PP Shiju a.k.a. Maharaja
 Swetha Menon as Meenakshi
 Praveena as Maria
 Anil Murali as Satheeshan, Police Inspector
 Augustine as Production Controller Subramaniyam
 Rohini as Nirmala
 Joju George as Hari, Gangster of Saidapet Giri
 Dinesh Panicker as Sreenivas, Daya's father
 Chitra Shenoy as Daya's mother
 Sindhu Shyam
 Lal Jose as himself (cameo)
 Vanitha as Chandramouli's mother (cameo)

Reception
The film received mostly negative reviews. On the other hand, the music was well received. 
Vidyasagar's music was popular especially the song "Chandamama", which stayed in the charts for many weeks. The failure of the movie also resulted in a small spat between Mohanlal and Ranjith which continued till the due came together for the hugely successful Spirit in 2012.

Soundtrack

The film's background score is composed by Bijibal, while the songs are composed by Vidyasagar with lyrics written by Gireesh Puthenchery. The songs were very popular.

Quotes 
"Rock & Roll is an out and out musical entertainer set in Chennai milieu with the background of a recording studio and the world of musicians. It's a fun-filled movie with Mohanlal leading the pack of merry men." - director Ranjith

References 

 Musicindiaonline.com preview
 Sunday Kaumudi preview
 Indulekha film profile (Malayalam)

External links 
 

2007 films
2000s Malayalam-language films
2000s musical films
Films shot in Chennai
Films scored by Vidyasagar
Films directed by Ranjith